is a former Japanese football player.

Club statistics

Team honors
J1 League - 2007, 2008, 2009

References

External links

1988 births
Living people
Association football people from Ibaraki Prefecture
Japanese footballers
J1 League players
J2 League players
Kashima Antlers players
Japan Soccer College players
Shonan Bellmare players
Tochigi SC players
Association football forwards